In triangle geometry, a circumcevian triangle is a special triangle associated with the reference triangle and a point in the plane of the triangle. It is also associated with the circumcircle of the reference triangle.

Definition

Let P be a point in the plane of the reference triangle ABC. Let the lines AP, BP, CP intersect the circumcircle of triangle ABC at A', B', C'. The triangle A'B'C' is called the circumcevian triangle of P with reference to the triangle ABC.

Coordinates
Let  be the side lengths of triangle ABC and let the trilinear coordinates of P be . Then the trilinear coordinates of the vertices of the circumcevian triangle of P are as follows:
A' 
B' 
C'

Some properties
Every triangle inscribed in the circumcircle of the reference triangle ABC is congruent to exactly one circumcevian triangle.
The circumcevian triangle of P is similar to the pedal triangle of P.
The McCay cubic is the locus of point P such that the circumcevian triangle of P and ABC are orthologic.

See also 

 Cevian
 Ceva's theorem

References

Triangle geometry